The Merry Widow is an operetta by Franz Lehár. 

The Merry Widow may also refer to:

Arts, entertainment, and media

Adaptations of Lehár's operetta
Ballet
 The Merry Widow (ballet), an adaptation of the operetta

Films
 The Merry Widow (1918 film), a Hungarian silent film directed by Michael Curtiz
 The Merry Widow (1925 film), a silent film directed by Erich von Stroheim, starring Mae Murray and John Gilbert
 The Merry Widow (1934 film) directed by Ernst Lubitsch, starring Maurice Chevalier and Jeanette MacDonald
 The Merry Widow (1952 film), directed by Curtis Bernhardt
 The Merry Widow (1962 film), Austrian film directed by Werner Jacobs
 The Merry Widow (2007 film), a French comedy film

Other arts, entertainment, and media
 The Merry Widow (TV series), a French television series which uses the music from the operetta, but not the plot
 Thee Merry Widows, a psychobilly band

People
 Mary Elizabeth Wilson (1889-1963), also known as the Merry widow of Windy Nook

Other uses
 Merry widow, a type of corselet
 Merry Widows of Joe Cain, Mardi Gras women's mystic society in Mobile, Alabama

See also

Widow